Fabio Paiella (25 April 1939 – 4 March 2003) was an Italian diver. He competed in the men's 10 metre platform event at the 1960 Summer Olympics.

References

External links
 

1939 births
2003 deaths
Italian male divers
Olympic divers of Italy
Divers at the 1960 Summer Olympics
Divers from Rome